The Clugston Group was a privately owned business involved in construction and civil engineering, property development and logistics. The group was based in Scunthorpe, North Lincolnshire in England. On 5 December 2019, the group and its construction businesses filed for administration, with debts of £64m.

History
The company was founded by Leonard Clugston in 1937 in Lincolnshire, as Clugston Cawood. Initially, it pioneered the development and use of recycled blast furnace slag from Scunthorpe’s iron and steel plants. This was used in the construction of runways for the RAF in the Second World War, and led the company into civil engineering, road construction and the building of sea defences on the east coast.

In June 2009, the then company CEO Stephen Martin went 'undercover' at the company for the television series of Channel 4, Undercover Boss.

Martin described the experience as extremely positive, and implemented a number of new measures as a result. In February 2017, Martin left to become director general of the Institute of Directors, and was replaced by Bob Vickers (formerly a director of Carillion Construction Services). Vickers resigned as CEO in June 2019; Glynn Thomas became interim CEO.

Administration
The company filed a notice of intention to appoint administrators from KPMG on 5 December 2019, for Clugston Group Ltd, Clugston Construction Ltd and Clugston Services Ltd. The group reportedly collapsed owing over £40m (a figure later revised to £64m), and was operating from over twenty five sites primarily across the Midlands and northern England. Some 250 employees were reportedly set to lose their jobs immediately.

Four hundred of Clugston's 629 strong workforce were employed in construction, and, on 9 December 150 were reported to have been made redundant. By 7 January 2020, the redundancies total had grown to 280; fifteen staff working on three facilities management contracts had been transferred to new employers, while fifty one staff were assisting the administrators.

The group's losses were blamed on problem energy from waste (EfW) contracts and an "acute cash flow issue" exacerbated by the June 2019 failure of a key subcontractor which resulted in "significant ransom positions from the supply chain".

The company had grown through participation, via a partnership with France's CNIM, in the construction of Energy for Waste (EfW) plants. EfW projects had also caused financial problems for other contractors in the United Kingdom, including Costain and Interserve. CNIM took on sixty seven former employees of Clugston, who had been working on joint venture projects in the United Kingdom.

Operations
The group was organised into five divisions:
Construction
Facilities management
Logistics
Private Finance
Property

The administration of December 2019 mainly concerned Clugston's construction related operations. Clugston Distribution Services was sold in January 2020, to Leicester-based AJWG. The Clugston Estates property business continued to trade until 3 February 2020, then also entered administration.

References

External links
Official site
Official site

Construction and civil engineering companies of England
Companies based in Scunthorpe
Construction and civil engineering companies established in 1937
1937 establishments in England
Real estate companies established in 1937
British companies established in 1937
British companies disestablished in 2019